Gorges Airfield is an abandoned World War II military airfield, which is located near the commune of Gorges in  the Manche region of northern France.

Located just outside Gorges (likely to the east or southeast), the United States Army Air Force established a temporary airfield on 2 August 1944, shortly after the Allied landings in France  The airfield was constructed by the IX Engineering Command, 826th Engineer Aviation Battalion.

History
Known as Advanced Landing Ground "A-26", the airfield consisted of a single 6000' (1300m) Pierced Steel Planking runway aligned 07/25. In addition, tents were used for billeting and also for support facilities; an access road was built to the existing road infrastructure; a dump for supplies, ammunition, and gasoline drums, along with a drinkable water and minimal electrical grid for communications and station lighting.

The 397th Bombardment Group, moved its B-26 Marauder bombers from RAF Hurn England to  Gorges on 16 August, remaining until 11 September 1944. The bombers attacked railroad bridges, gun emplacements and fuel dumps, along with railroad marshalling yards and German troop concentrations in the occupied areas of France.

After the Americans moved east into Central France with the advancing Allied Armies, the airfield was closed on 28 September 1944.  Today the long dismantled airfield is indistinguishable from the agricultural fields in the area.

References

External links
  A-26 Memorial

World War II airfields in France
Airfields of the United States Army Air Forces in France
Airports established in 1944